Dąbrówka may refer to:

Dąbrówka, Brodnica County in Kuyavian-Pomeranian Voivodeship (north-central Poland)
Czarna Dąbrówka, a village in Farther Pomerania, Poland
Dąbrówka Bytowska (PKP station), a non-operational railway station in Pomeranian Voivodeship, Poland
Dąbrówka Kościelna, Greater Poland Voivodeship (west-central Poland)
Dąbrówka Mała, a district of Katowice, Poland
Dąbrówka, Lipno County in Kuyavian-Pomeranian Voivodeship (north-central Poland)
Dąbrówka, Radziejów County in Kuyavian-Pomeranian Voivodeship (north-central Poland)
Dąbrówka, Świecie County in Kuyavian-Pomeranian Voivodeship (north-central Poland)
Dąbrówka, Tuchola County in Kuyavian-Pomeranian Voivodeship (north-central Poland)
Dąbrówka, Wąbrzeźno County in Kuyavian-Pomeranian Voivodeship (north-central Poland)
Dąbrówka, Gmina Kowal in Kuyavian-Pomeranian Voivodeship (north-central Poland)
Dąbrówka, Gmina Lubanie in Kuyavian-Pomeranian Voivodeship (north-central Poland)
Dąbrówka, Sępólno County in Kuyavian-Pomeranian Voivodeship (north-central Poland)
Dąbrówka, Mogilno County in Kuyavian-Pomeranian Voivodeship (north-central Poland)
Dąbrówka, Biłgoraj County in Lublin Voivodeship (east Poland)
Dąbrówka, Janów Lubelski County in Lublin Voivodeship (east Poland)
Dąbrówka, Lubartów County in Lublin Voivodeship (east Poland)
Dąbrówka, Gmina Sokółka in Podlaskie Voivodeship (north-east Poland)
Dąbrówka, Gmina Janów in Podlaskie Voivodeship (north-east Poland)
Dąbrówka, Bytów County in Pomeranian Voivodeship (north Poland)
Dąbrówka, Łask County in Łódź Voivodeship (central Poland)
Dąbrówka, Łódź East County in Łódź Voivodeship (central Poland)
Dąbrówka, Gmina Drzewica in Łódź Voivodeship (central Poland)
Dąbrówka, Gmina Sławno in Łódź Voivodeship (central Poland)
Dąbrówka, Pajęczno County in Łódź Voivodeship (central Poland)
Dąbrówka, Gmina Aleksandrów in Łódź Voivodeship (central Poland)
Dąbrówka, Gmina Moszczenica in Łódź Voivodeship (central Poland)
Dąbrówka, Gmina Wola Krzysztoporska in Łódź Voivodeship (central Poland)
Dąbrówka, Poddębice County in Łódź Voivodeship (central Poland)
Dąbrówka, Radomsko County in Łódź Voivodeship (central Poland)
Dąbrówka, Gmina Sieradz in Łódź Voivodeship (central Poland)
Dąbrówka, Gmina Wróblew in Łódź Voivodeship (central Poland)
Dąbrówka, Tomaszów Mazowiecki County in Łódź Voivodeship (central Poland)
Dąbrówka, Wieruszów County in Łódź Voivodeship (central Poland)
Dąbrówka, Łuków County in Lublin Voivodeship (east Poland)
Dąbrówka, Bochnia County in Lesser Poland Voivodeship (south Poland)
Dąbrówka, Wadowice County in Lesser Poland Voivodeship (south Poland)
Dąbrówka, Jasło County in Subcarpathian Voivodeship (south-east Poland)
Dąbrówka, Lubaczów County in Subcarpathian Voivodeship (south-east Poland)
Dąbrówka, Nisko County in Subcarpathian Voivodeship (south-east Poland)
Dąbrówka, Opatów County in Świętokrzyskie Voivodeship (south-central Poland)
Dąbrówka, Gmina Krasocin in Świętokrzyskie Voivodeship (south-central Poland)
Dąbrówka, Gmina Moskorzew in Świętokrzyskie Voivodeship (south-central Poland)
Dąbrówka, Białobrzegi County in Masovian Voivodeship (east-central Poland)
Dąbrówka, Gostynin County in Masovian Voivodeship (east-central Poland)
Dąbrówka, Grójec County in Masovian Voivodeship (east-central Poland)
Dąbrówka, Gmina Lipsko in Masovian Voivodeship (east-central Poland)
Dąbrówka, Gmina Sienno in Masovian Voivodeship (east-central Poland)
Dąbrówka, Gmina Czerwonka in Masovian Voivodeship (east-central Poland)
Dąbrówka, Gmina Różan in Masovian Voivodeship (east-central Poland)
Dąbrówka, Gmina Rzewnie in Masovian Voivodeship (east-central Poland)
Dąbrówka, Mińsk County in Masovian Voivodeship (east-central Poland)
Dąbrówka, Ostrołęka County in Masovian Voivodeship (east-central Poland)
Dąbrówka, Otwock County in Masovian Voivodeship (east-central Poland)
Dąbrówka, Sokołów County in Masovian Voivodeship (east-central Poland)
Dąbrówka, Warsaw, a neighbourhood in Warsaw, Masovian Voivodeship (east-central Poland)
Dąbrówka, Wołomin County in Masovian Voivodeship (east-central Poland)
Dąbrówka, Nowy Dwór Mazowiecki County in Masovian Voivodeship (east-central Poland)
Dąbrówka, Gostyń County in Greater Poland Voivodeship (west-central Poland)
Dąbrówka, Koło County in Greater Poland Voivodeship (west-central Poland)
Dąbrówka, Międzychód County in Greater Poland Voivodeship (west-central Poland)
Dąbrówka, Poznań County in Greater Poland Voivodeship (west-central Poland)
Dąbrówka, Rawicz County in Greater Poland Voivodeship (west-central Poland)
Dąbrówka, Gliwice County in Silesian Voivodeship (south Poland)
Dąbrówka, Kłobuck County in Silesian Voivodeship (south Poland)
Dąbrówka, Lubusz Voivodeship (west Poland)
Dąbrówka, Opole Voivodeship (south-west Poland)
Dąbrówka, Chojnice County in Pomeranian Voivodeship (north Poland)
Dąbrówka, Gmina Dziemiany in Pomeranian Voivodeship (north Poland)
Dąbrówka, Gmina Kościerzyna in Pomeranian Voivodeship (north Poland)
Dąbrówka, Słupsk County in Pomeranian Voivodeship (north Poland)
Dąbrówka, Starogard County in Pomeranian Voivodeship (north Poland)
Dąbrówka, Tczew County in Pomeranian Voivodeship (north Poland)
Dąbrówka, Gmina Gniewino in Pomeranian Voivodeship (north Poland)
Dąbrówka, Gmina Luzino in Pomeranian Voivodeship (north Poland)
Dąbrówka, Iława County in Warmian-Masurian Voivodeship (north Poland)
Dąbrówka, Lidzbark County in Warmian-Masurian Voivodeship (north Poland)
Dąbrówka, Olsztyn County in Warmian-Masurian Voivodeship (north Poland)
Dąbrówka, Pisz County in Warmian-Masurian Voivodeship (north Poland)
Dąbrówka, Węgorzewo County in Warmian-Masurian Voivodeship (north Poland)
Dąbrówka, Szczecinek County in West Pomeranian Voivodeship (north-west Poland)
Dąbrówka, Świdwin County in West Pomeranian Voivodeship (north-west Poland)

See also 
 Dąbrówka of Poland, Doubravka of Bohemia, a Bohemian princess member of the Přemyslid dynasty and by marriage Duchess of the Polans
 Dubravka (disambiguation)
 Doubravka